Neil Johnson may refer to:

Neil Johnson (cricketer) (born 1970), former cricketer who played for Zimbabwe
Neil F. Johnson (born 1961), physicist
Neil Johnson (director) (born 1967), British film and music video producer, director, and editor
Neil Johnson (basketball) (born 1943), retired American basketball player
Neil Johnson (footballer) (born 1946), English footballer
Neil Johnson (volleyball), Canadian standing volleyball player

See also
Neil Johnston (1929–1978), basketball player